Mourad Aliev (born 31 July 1995) is a French professional boxer. As an amateur he won a silver medal at the 2019 European Games. While representing France at the 2020 Summer Olympics, Aliev was disqualified from his quarterfinal bout.

Early life
Born in Moscow, Russia, and of Azerbaijani descent, Aliev moved to France at the age of six as a political refugee and became a naturalised French citizen at the age of 22.

Amateur career
At the 2020 Tokyo Olympics, Aliev was disqualified in his bout against Frazer Clarke due to a head-butt. As soon as the decision was announced in the ring, Aliev had denounced an injustice. Later, the supervisor certified an error in refereeing and said that there is no error on the part of Aliev, but the decision can not be modified. Aliev staged a sit-in protest for an hour, after punching the ringside camera operator. Both actual and former French National Olympic and Sports Committee presidents supported Aliev against what they consider being an injustice.

Professional career
Aliev made his professional debut on 20 November 2021, scoring a four-round unanimous decision (UD) victory against German Skobenko at the Universum Gym in Hamburg, Germany.

Professional boxing record

Personal life
His father, Ozer, was also an amateur boxer, representing the USSR.

References

French people of Azerbaijani descent
Russian sportspeople of Azerbaijani descent
French male boxers
Super-heavyweight boxers
Southpaw boxers
Boxers at the 2019 European Games
European Games medalists in boxing
European Games gold medalists for France
Living people
Boxers at the 2020 Summer Olympics
Olympic boxers of France
1995 births
Russian emigrants to France